is a 2011 Japanese film that is based on a true story of an abandoned Akita Dog.

Cast
 Hiroko Yakushimaru as Setsuko
 Masahiro Komoto
 Sawa Suzuki
 Jun Yoshinaga
 Daisuke Shima
 Masaki Izawa
 Toshinori Omi
 Mansaku Fuwa
 Koichi Ueda
 Shiro Sano
 Takashi Sasano
 Mitsuru Hirata

References

External links
 

Toei Company films
Films about dogs
Drama films based on actual events
Japanese films based on actual events
2010s Japanese films